Paul Hamy (born 7 January 1982) is a French actor and model. He started his career early as a model, working for Elite Model Management before turning to cinema in 2013.

Filmography

Theater

References

External links 

1982 births
Living people
French male film actors